Francesc 'Fran' Piera Martínez (born 19 December 1987 in Barcelona, Catalonia) is a Spanish footballer who plays for CD Masnou as a midfielder.

References

External links

1987 births
Living people
Footballers from Barcelona
Spanish footballers
Association football midfielders
Segunda División players
Segunda División B players
Tercera División players
Divisiones Regionales de Fútbol players
Deportivo Alavés B players
UE Sant Andreu footballers
Villarreal CF B players
FC Santboià players
CD Puertollano footballers
CE Sabadell FC footballers
CD Alcoyano footballers
La Roda CF players
UE Cornellà players
AE Prat players
Terrassa FC footballers
UE Vilajuïga footballers
CD Masnou players
Cypriot First Division players
Doxa Katokopias FC players
Primera Divisió players
UE Sant Julià players
Spanish expatriate footballers
Expatriate footballers in Cyprus
Expatriate footballers in Andorra
Spanish expatriate sportspeople in Cyprus
Spanish expatriate sportspeople in Andorra